Mythimna sinuosa is a moth in the family Noctuidae. It is found in India and Taiwan.

References

Moths described in 1882
Mythimna (moth)
Moths of Asia